Igor Sergeyevich Diveyev (born 27 September 1999) is a Russian football player who plays as centre-back for CSKA Moscow.

Career

Club
Diveyev made his debut in the Russian Premier League for FC Ufa on 26 August 2018 in a game against FC Zenit Saint Petersburg.

On 22 February 2019, Diveyev joined the CSKA Moscow on loan until the end of the 2018–19 season, with an option for the move to be made permanent in the summer of 2019. On 31 May 2019, CSKA Moscow announced that they had exercised their option to make Diveyev's loan deal permanent, signing him to a five-year contract.

International
In November 2020, he was called up to the Russia national football team for the first time for the games against Moldova, Turkey and Serbia. He made his debut on 12 November 2020 in a friendly against Moldova. He made his competitive debut on 18 November 2020 in a Nations League game against Serbia, Russia allowed 4 goals in the first half and Diveyev was substituted at half-time. After the game he was diagnosed with a concussion and a broken nose that he suffered early in the game but remained on the field.

On 11 May 2021, he was included in the preliminary extended 30-man squad for UEFA Euro 2020. On 2 June 2021, he was included in the final squad. In Russia's opening game against Belgium on 12 June, he came on as a half-time substitute as Russia lost 0–3. He started and played the full match in the second game against Finland on 16 June in a 1–0 victory. He again played the full match on 21 June in the last group game against Denmark as Russia lost 1–4 and was eliminated.

He scored his first international goal on 11 October 2021 in a World Cup qualifier against Slovenia.

Career statistics

Club

International

International goals

Scores and results list Russia's goal tally first.

References

External links
 

1999 births
Living people
Footballers from Ufa
Russian footballers
Russia youth international footballers
Russia under-21 international footballers
Russia international footballers
Association football defenders
FC Ufa players
PFC CSKA Moscow players
Russian Premier League players
Russian Second League players
UEFA Euro 2020 players